Miguel Marques may refer to:
Miguel Marqués (composer) (1843–1918), Spanish composer
Miguel Marques (footballer) (born 1963), Portuguese footballer